Euryeidon is a genus of spiders in the family Zodariidae. It was first described in 2004 by Dankittipakul & Jocqué. , it contains 6 species, all from Thailand.

Species
Euryeidon comprises the following species:
Euryeidon anthonyi Dankittipakul & Jocqué, 2004
Euryeidon consideratum Dankittipakul & Jocqué, 2004
Euryeidon monticola Dankittipakul & Jocqué, 2004
Euryeidon musicum Dankittipakul & Jocqué, 2004
Euryeidon schwendingeri Dankittipakul & Jocqué, 2004
Euryeidon sonthichaiae Dankittipakul & Jocqué, 2004

References

Zodariidae
Araneomorphae genera
Spiders of Asia